Nobuki (written: ,  or  in katakana) is a masculine Japanese given name. Notable people with the name include:

, Japanese footballer
, Japanese fashion designer
, Japanese footballer

See also
Nobuki Station, a former railway station in Akitakata, Hiroshima Prefecture, Japan

Japanese masculine given names